The Industrial Academy was an educational institution operating in Moscow from 1925 to 1941; it also had branches in Leningrad (from 1929) and Sverdlovsk (from 1931).

The Industrial Academy was intended as the next step after attending a Rabfak and was intended to "provide its students with a grounding in general economic management, as well as a technical specialization" - "a school for managers and directors." The first students graduated in 1930. Many of the Soviet nomenklatura of the Stalin era graduated from the Academy in the 1930s. Although it was officially considered an institution of higher education, the Industrial Academy actually provided a secondary school education, as well as technical knowledge required for work in industry. Over the years, the Industrial Academy was given the names of Lazar Kaganovich, Vyacheslav Molotov, and finally Joseph Stalin. In July 1941, by a decision of the State Defense Committee, the Academy of Industry was disbanded.

References

Notable teachers 
Yakov Chernikhov

Notable alumni 
Nadezhda Alliluyeva
Semyon Ignatyev
Alexey Stakhanov

Nikita Khrushchev attended but did not graduate. He later became the party secretary of the academy before becoming the Party leader for the Bauman district, site of the Academy.

See also 
 Education in Russia
 Rabfak

1925 establishments in Russia
Educational institutions established in 1925
Vocational education in the Soviet Union
Universities and institutes established in the Soviet Union
Universities and colleges in Moscow
Engineering universities and colleges in Russia
Science and technology in Russia
1941 disestablishments in the Soviet Union
Educational institutions disestablished in 1941